Murgisca subductellus is a species of snout moth in the genus Murgisca. It was described by Heinrich Benno Möschler in 1890, and is known from Puerto Rico.

References

Moths described in 1890
Chrysauginae